Mustafa Reşit Akçay (born 12 December 1958) is a Turkish professional football manager who is the manager of TFF Second League club Esenler Erokspor.

Managerial statistics

Honours

Manager
1461 Trabzon
TFF Second League: 2011–12 (Red Group)

Konyaspor
Turkish Super Cup: 2017

References

External links
Mustafa Reşit Akçay at TFF.org 
Mustafa Reşit Akçay at Maçkolik.com 

1958 births
Living people
Sportspeople from Trabzon
Turkish football managers
Süper Lig managers
Trabzonspor managers
Akhisarspor managers
Konyaspor managers
MKE Ankaragücü managers
Kocaelispor managers